The British Virgin Islands national under-16 and under-17 basketball team is a national basketball team of the British Virgin Islands, administered by the British Virgin Islands Amateur Basketball Federation.
It represents the country in international under-16 and under-17 (under age 16 and under age 17) basketball competitions.

See also
British Virgin Islands national basketball team
British Virgin Islands national under-19 basketball team
British Virgin Islands women's national under-17 basketball team

References

External links
Archived records of British Virgin Islands team participations

Basketball teams in the British Virgin Islands
Men's national under-17 basketball teams
Basketball